Litogamasus is a genus of mites in the family Ologamasidae.

Species
These two species belong to the genus Litogamasus:
 Litogamasus falcipes Lee & Hunter, 1974
 Litogamasus setosus (Kramer, 1898)

References

Ologamasidae